Make the Difference is the second studio album by American singer-songwriter Tracie Spencer. It was released on August 27, 1990, by Capitol Records.

Background
The album consists some of Spencer's most notable songs, including "Tender Kisses" which peaked at number 1 on the Hot R&B Singles chart and number 42 on the Billboard Hot 100 pop chart in 1991. Spencer's other single, "This House" reached number 3 on the Billboard Hot 100 in March 1991, and became her second consecutive top 10 hit on Billboard magazine's Hot R&B Singles chart, where it peaked at number 7 that same month.

Track listing
"This House" (Matt Sherrod, Paul Sherrod, Sir Spence)  – 5:07
"Save Your Love" (Kenny Harris) – 5:05
"Tender Kisses"  (Matt Sherrod, Paul Sherrod, Sir Spence, Tracie Spencer) – 5:28
"Too Much of Nothing" (Matt Sherrod, Paul Sherrod) – 5:14
"Double O Rhythm" (Kyle Hudnall, Sir Spence, Tracie Spencer) – 4:49
"You Make the Difference" (Matt Sherrod, Paul Sherrod, Sir Spence) – 5:05
"This Time Make It Funky" (Matt Sherrod, Paul Sherrod, Sir Spence) – 5:25
"I Like That" (Kyle Hudnall) – 5:05
"I Have a Song to Sing" (Matt Sherrod, Paul Sherrod, Sir Spence) – 4:36
"Sweeter Love" (Matt Sherrod, Paul Sherrod, Sir Spence) – 4:13
"Love Me" (T. Robinson) – 5:03
"Tracie's Hideout" (Matt Sherrod, Paul Sherrod, Sir Spence)  – 5:55

Charts

References 

1990 albums
Capitol Records albums
Tracie Spencer albums